Artur Mikołaj Wichniarek (born 28 February 1977) is a Polish former professional footballer who played as a striker. Having established himself in the Ekstraklasa with Widzew Łódź, Wichniarek moved to Germany in 1999 to join Bundesliga club Arminia Bielefeld. Good performances at Arminia Bielefeld earned him a move to Hertha BSC where he did not become a regular starter. He returned to Arminia Bielefeld in 2006. After three years, he spent another season at Hertha BSC.

Career

Early career in Poland
Wichniarek started his professional career at Lech Poznań in 1992–93 season. The following season, he made his Ekstraklasa debut, however, he was not able to secure a place in the starting eleven. In the spring of 1996 was loaned to Polish Second League club Górnik Konin. Upon his return to his home club he managed to win the manager's confidence and in the following 1996–97 season he played 30 times, albeit scoring only four goals. In 1998, Wichniarek joined Widzew Łódź, where he played until 1999, appearing 57 times and scoring 28 goals all together, most of them in the 1998–99 season.

Arminia Bielefeld
His talent drew the attention of Arminia Bielefeld's directors, who brought him to Bielefeld, where he impressed the fans, becoming the club's leading player and best striker. In 2001–02 season he won the title of 2. Bundesliga top scorer, which earned him the nickname King Arthur.

Hertha BSC
Hertha BSC took notice and in 2003 he moved to Olympiastadion, however, he usually appeared only as a sub. After two seasons in Berlin, in the beginning of 2006, with 44 appearances and four goals on his sheet, he moved back to Arminia Bielefeld.

Return to Bielefeld
Wichniarek became one of Arminia's dominant players, scoring 33 goals in three seasons. Wichniarek was named the Bundesliga's Footballer of the Month in August 2008.

Second stint at Hertha
On 3 July 2009, Wichniarek left the newly relegated Arminia Bielefeld and returned to former club Hertha BSC signing a two-year contract. After the relegation of Hertha BSC, Wichniarek was released from his contract on 15 June 2010.

Return to Lech Poznań
Wichniarek signed a one-year contract with first club Lech Poznań on 30 June 2010. His contract was terminated by Lech Poznań on 3 November 2010.

International career
Wichniarek made his first appearance for the Poland national team on 3 March 1999. The fixture was against Armenia where the Poles won 1–0. Wichniarek was not among the manager's favorites and his occasional appearances were usually limited to friendlies. His first international goal was at the expense of the Czech Republic national team on 28 April 1999. All together, he appeared in 17 international matches and four of his shots found their way into the opponents' net. His last significant cap was against Estonia in Tallinn, where he scored one of the two goals for the winners.

International goals
Scores and results list Poland's goal tally first, score column indicates score after each Wichniarek goal.

References

External links
 
 
 

1977 births
Living people
Footballers from Poznań
Polish footballers
Association football forwards
Poland international footballers
Ekstraklasa players
Bundesliga players
2. Bundesliga players
Lech Poznań players
Widzew Łódź players
Arminia Bielefeld players
Hertha BSC players
Polish expatriate footballers
Polish expatriate sportspeople in Germany
Expatriate footballers in Germany